Hyperimmune may refer to:

 A hyperimmune set in computability theory
 Hyperimmunization, the presence of a larger-than-normal number of antibodies
 Hyperimmune globulin, a substance similar to Intravenous Immunoglobulin (IVIG)